Geostatistics is a branch of statistics focusing on spatial or spatiotemporal datasets. Developed originally to predict probability distributions of ore grades for mining operations, it is currently applied in diverse disciplines including petroleum geology, hydrogeology, hydrology, meteorology, oceanography, geochemistry, geometallurgy, geography, forestry, environmental control, landscape ecology, soil science, and agriculture (esp. in precision farming). Geostatistics is applied in varied branches of geography, particularly those involving the spread of diseases (epidemiology), the practice of commerce and military planning (logistics), and the development of efficient spatial networks. Geostatistical algorithms are incorporated in many places, including geographic information systems (GIS).

Background
Geostatistics is intimately related to interpolation methods, but extends far beyond simple interpolation problems. Geostatistical techniques rely on statistical models that are based on random function (or random variable) theory to model the uncertainty associated with spatial estimation and simulation.

A number of simpler interpolation methods/algorithms, such as inverse distance weighting, bilinear interpolation and nearest-neighbor interpolation, were already well known before geostatistics. Geostatistics goes beyond the interpolation problem by considering the studied phenomenon at unknown locations as a set of correlated random variables.

Let  be the value of the variable of interest at a certain location . This value is unknown (e.g. temperature, rainfall, piezometric level, geological facies, etc.). Although there exists a value at location  that could be measured, geostatistics considers this value as random since it was not measured, or has not been measured yet.

Conversely, in the absence of spatial continuity  can take any value. The spatial continuity of the random variables is described by a model of spatial continuity that can be either a parametric function in the case of variogram-based geostatistics, or have a non-parametric form when using other methods  such as multiple-point simulation or pseudo-genetic techniques.

By applying a single spatial model on an entire domain, one makes the assumption that  is a stationary process. It means that the same statistical properties are applicable on the entire domain. Several geostatistical methods provide ways of relaxing this stationarity assumption.

In this framework, one can distinguish two modeling goals:

This is usually denoted as an estimation problem.
 Sampling from the entire probability density function  by actually considering each possible outcome of it at each location. Consider a domain discretized in  grid nodes (or pixels). Each realization is a sample of the complete -dimensional joint distribution function

 

 In this approach, the presence of multiple solutions to the interpolation problem is acknowledged. Each realization is considered as a possible scenario of what the real variable could be. All associated workflows are then considering ensemble of realizations, and consequently ensemble of predictions that allow for probabilistic forecasting. Therefore, geostatistics is often used to generate or update spatial models when solving inverse problems.

A number of methods exist for both geostatistical estimation and multiple realizations approaches. Several reference books provide a comprehensive overview of the discipline.

Methods

Estimation

Kriging 

Kriging is a group of geostatistical techniques to interpolate the value of a random field (e.g., the elevation, z, of the landscape as a function of the geographic location) at an unobserved location from observations of its value at nearby locations.

Bayesian estimation 

Bayesian inference is a method of statistical inference in which Bayes' theorem is used to update a probability model as more evidence or information becomes available. Bayesian inference is playing an increasingly important role in Geostatistics. Bayesian estimation implements kriging through a spatial process, most commonly a Gaussian process, and updates the process using Bayes' Theorem to calculate its posterior. High-dimensional Bayesian Geostatistics

Finite difference method 
Considering the principle of conservation of probability, recurrent difference equations (finite difference equations) were used in conjunction with lattices to compute probabilities quantifying uncertainty about the geological structures. This procedure is a numerical alternative method to Markov chains and Bayesian models.

Simulation
 Aggregation
 Dissagregation
 Turning bands
 Cholesky decomposition
 Truncated Gaussian
 Plurigaussian
 Annealing 
 Spectral simulation
 Sequential Indicator
 Sequential Gaussian 
 Dead Leave 
 Transition probabilities
 Markov chain geostatistics
 Markov mesh models
 Support vector machine
 Boolean simulation
 Genetic models
 Pseudo-genetic models
 Cellular automata
 Multiple-Point Geostatistics

Definitions and tools
 Regionalized variable theory
 Covariance function
 Semi-variance
 Variogram
 Kriging
 Range (geostatistics)
 Sill (geostatistics)
 Nugget effect
 Training image
 Finite difference method

Related academic journals 

 Water Resources Research
 Advances in Water Resources
 Ground Water 
 Mathematical Geosciences
 Computers & Geosciences
 Computational Geosciences
 J. Soil Science Society of America 
 Environmetrics
 Remote Sensing of the Environment
 Stochastic Environmental Research and Risk Assessment

Scientific organisations related to geostatistics
European Forum for Geography and Statistics (EFGS; formerly the European Forum for Geostatistics)
GeoEnvia promotes the use of geostatistical methods in environmental applications
International Association for Mathematical Geosciences

See also 

 Arbia's law of geography
 Concepts and Techniques in Modern Geography
 Multivariate interpolation
 Spline interpolation
 Geodemographic segmentation
 Geodesy
 Geographic Information Science
 Geographic Information Systems
 Geomatics
 SaTScan
 Remote sensing
 Pedometrics
 Time geography
 Tobler's first law of geography
 Tobler's second law of geography
 Uncertain geographic context problem

Notes

References 
 Armstrong, M and Champigny, N, 1988, A Study on Kriging Small Blocks, CIM Bulletin, Vol 82, No 923
 Armstrong, M, 1992, Freedom of Speech? De Geeostatisticis, July, No 14
 Champigny, N, 1992, Geostatistics: A tool that works, The Northern Miner, May 18
 Clark I, 1979, Practical Geostatistics, Applied Science Publishers, London
 David, M, 1977, Geostatistical Ore Reserve Estimation, Elsevier Scientific Publishing Company, Amsterdam
 Hald, A, 1952, Statistical Theory with Engineering Applications, John Wiley & Sons, New York
  (best paper award IAMG 09)
 ISO/DIS 11648-1 Statistical aspects of sampling from bulk materials-Part1: General principles
 Lipschutz, S, 1968, Theory and Problems of Probability, McCraw-Hill Book Company, New York.
 Matheron, G. 1962. Traité de géostatistique appliquée. Tome 1, Editions Technip, Paris, 334 pp.
 Matheron, G. 1989. Estimating and choosing, Springer-Verlag, Berlin.
 McGrew, J. Chapman, & Monroe, Charles B., 2000. An introduction to statistical problem solving in geography, second edition, McGraw-Hill, New York.
 Merks, J W, 1992, Geostatistics or voodoo science, The Northern Miner, May 18
 Merks, J W, Abuse of statistics, CIM Bulletin, January 1993, Vol 86, No 966
 Myers, Donald E.; "What Is Geostatistics?
 Philip, G M and Watson, D F, 1986, Matheronian Geostatistics; Quo Vadis?, Mathematical Geology, Vol 18, No 1 
 Pyrcz, M.J. and Deutsch, C.V., 2014, Geostatistical Reservoir Modeling, 2nd Edition, Oxford University Press, New York, p. 448 
 Sharov, A: Quantitative Population Ecology, 1996, https://web.archive.org/web/20020605050231/http://www.ento.vt.edu/~sharov/PopEcol/popecol.html
 Shine, J.A., Wakefield, G.I.: A comparison of supervised imagery classification using analyst-chosen and geostatistically-chosen training sets, 1999, https://web.archive.org/web/20020424165227/http://www.geovista.psu.edu/sites/geocomp99/Gc99/044/gc_044.htm
 Strahler, A. H., and Strahler A., 2006, Introducing Physical Geography, 4th Ed., Wiley.
 Tahmasebi, P., Hezarkhani, A., Sahimi, M., 2012, Multiple-point geostatistical modeling based on the cross-correlation functions, Computational Geosciences, 16(3):779-79742.
 Volk, W, 1980, Applied Statistics for Engineers, Krieger Publishing Company, Huntington, New York.

External links

 GeoENVia promotes the use of geostatistical methods in environmental applications, and organizes bi-annual conferences.
 , a resource on the internet about geostatistics and spatial statistics
 On-Line Library that chronicles Matheron's journey from classical statistics to the new science of geostatistics
 
 https://web.archive.org/web/20040326205028/http://geostatscam.com/ Is the site of Jan W. Merks, who claims that geostatistics is "voodoo science" and a "scientific fraud"
  It is a group for exchanging of ideas and discussion on multiple point geostatistics (MPS).